Arthur Weiss (13 June 1912 – 26 August 1980) was an American script writer for two decades on action/adventure TV shows like Mission: Impossible, Mannix, The Fugitive, Super Friends, The Time Tunnel and Sea Hunt. His most famous creation was the script for the movie Flipper in 1963, which became a TV series and was remade as a movie in 1996. He also worked alongside Irwin Allen as a writer and producer for "disaster" TV films including Flood! and Fire!.

In 1969 Weiss published the novel O'Kelly's Eclipse about the undefeated British racehorse Eclipse.

Weiss married actress Fay Baker on 3 August 1940. He divorced in 1965 and later married Patricia Jones.

Television series scripts

Television series production

Filmography

References

External links
 
 Fandango
 Inbaseline
 Fancast
 NY Times Filmography
 MGM

1912 births
1980 deaths
American male screenwriters
Writers from New York City
Screenwriters from New York (state)
20th-century American male writers
20th-century American screenwriters